Dominique Auguste Lereboullet was a French doctor and zoologist. He was born on 19 September, 1804 at Épinal, and died of an apoplectic fit on 6 October, 1865 in Strasbourg.

He began his studies at Colmar before specialising in medicine at Strasbourg where he graduated as a doctor with a thesis about cholera. While practising medicine, he kept up a series of studies into comparative anatomy of animals. On the departure of Georges Louis Duvernoy to Paris, Lereboullet took the opportunity to occupy the chair of zoology and comparative anatomy at the faculty of science in Strasbourg.

His zoological studies included works on the genitals of vertebrates, foie gras, comparative embryology of fish and carcinology.

References

1804 births
1865 deaths
French carcinologists
French zoologists
People from Épinal
University of Strasbourg alumni
Academic staff of the University of Strasbourg